Slávek is male given name. Its origin is the short form of a Slavic names ending in -slav (Stanislav, Květoslav, Pravoslav, Branislav, Rostislav, Miroslav, Miloslav, Sobiesław, Svatoslav) and beginning Slav- (Slavomir, Slavomil). Pronounced slah:vek.

Name days 
Czech: 22 January

Other variants 
Russian: Slav (given name), Slaviy, Slava
Serbian: Slavko
Croatian: Slavko
Bulgarian: Slavo, Slavko
Polish: Sławomir, Sławek
Ukrainian: Slávko

Famous bearers 
Slávek Boura, Czech moderator
Slávek Janoušek, Czech folk singer
Slávek Janda, Czech pop singer
Slávek Hrzal, Czech teacher and redactor
Slávek Pokorný, Czech photographer
Slavek Pytraczyk, Calgary based Visual Artist
Slávek Volavý, Czech actor
Slávek Bártík, Moravian politician

External links 
Slávek → Behind the Name

Czech masculine given names

pl:Sławomir